Graycassis is a genus of Australian white tailed spiders that was first described by Norman I. Platnick in 2000.

Species
 it contains ten species:
Graycassis barrington Platnick, 2000 – Australia (New South Wales)
Graycassis boss Platnick, 2000 – Australia (New South Wales)
Graycassis bruxner Platnick, 2000 – Australia (New South Wales)
Graycassis bulga Platnick, 2000 – Australia (New South Wales)
Graycassis chichester Platnick, 2000 – Australia (Queensland, New South Wales)
Graycassis dorrigo Platnick, 2000 – Australia (New South Wales)
Graycassis enfield Platnick, 2000 – Australia (New South Wales)
Graycassis marengo Platnick, 2000 (type) – Australia (New South Wales)
Graycassis scrub Platnick, 2000 – Australia (New South Wales)
Graycassis styx Platnick, 2000 – Australia (New South Wales)

See also
 List of Lamponidae species

References

Araneomorphae genera
Lamponidae
Spiders of Australia